Rebecca Cunningham may refer to:

Disney character from TailSpin
Rebecca Miriam Cunningham, physician and researcher at the University of Michigan